Bulideh (also Romanized as Būlīdeh) is a village in Ahlamerestaq-e Jonubi Rural District, in the Central District of Mahmudabad County, Mazandaran Province, Iran. At the 2006 census, its population was 286, in 63 families.

References 

Populated places in Mahmudabad County